Statistics of Bahraini Premier League in the 1964–65 season.

Overview
Muharraq Club won the championship.

References
RSSSF

Bahraini Premier League seasons
Bah
1964–65 in Bahraini football